The 1968 Major League Baseball expansion draft was conducted to stock up the rosters of four expansion teams in Major League Baseball created via the 1969 Major League Baseball expansion and which would begin play in the 1969 season.

The expansion draft for the Montreal Expos and the San Diego Padres was held on October 14, 1968.  The expansion draft for the Kansas City Royals and the Seattle Pilots was held on October 15, 1968.

Background

Montreal Expos
On December 2, 1967, Gerry Snyder presented a bid for a Montreal franchise to Major League Baseball's team owners at their winter meetings in Mexico City. One potential wild card in Montreal's favor was that the chair of the National League's expansion committee was influential Los Angeles Dodgers president Walter O'Malley, under whom the minor league Montreal Royals had become affiliated with the Dodgers. On May 27, 1968, O'Malley announced that franchises were being awarded to Montreal and San Diego, beginning play the following year (1969).

Business executive Charles Bronfman of the Seagram's distilling empire owned the new team. With a long history of use in Montreal, the "Royals" was one of the candidate nicknames for the new franchise, but the American League's new Kansas City team adopted this name, so the new owners conducted a contest to name the team. Many names were suggested by Montrealers (including the "Voyageurs" and in a coincidental twist, the "Nationals" — now used by the team in its new home in Washington, D.C.) but there was a clear winner. At the time, the city was still basking in the glow of the recently completed Expo 67, the most popular World's Fair to date, and so the name "Expos" was used. The Expos name also had the advantage of being the same in both English and French, the city's two dominant languages.

San Diego Padres
The Padres adopted their name from the Pacific Coast League team which arrived in San Diego in 1936. That minor league franchise won the PCL title in 1937, led by then-18-year-old San Diego native Ted Williams. Their original owner was C. Arnholt Smith, a prominent San Diego businessman and former owner of the PCL Padres whose interests included banking, tuna fishing, hotels, real estate and an airline. The team was led by longtime baseball executive Buzzie Bavasi.

Kansas City Royals
The "Royals" name originates from the American Royal Livestock Show, held in Kansas City since 1899. Entering Major League Baseball as an expansion franchise in 1969, the club was founded by Ewing Kauffman, a Kansas City businessman. The franchise was established following the actions of Stuart Symington, then-United States Senator from Missouri, who demanded a new franchise for the city after the Athletics—Kansas City's previous major league team—moved to Oakland, California.

Seattle Pilots
Seattle initially had much going for it when it joined the American League in 1969. Seattle had long been a hotbed for minor league baseball and was home to the Seattle Rainiers, one of the pillars of the Pacific Coast League (PCL). Many of the same things that attracted the Indians made Seattle a plum choice for an expansion team. Seattle was the third-biggest metropolitan area on the West Coast (behind Los Angeles and San Francisco Bay Area).

Draft results

National League Draft

American League Draft

Notes
The Expos acquired Bobby Wine as compensation after Larry Jackson decided to retire rather than report to Montreal.

Dave Giusti never played for the Padres. He was traded back to the Cardinals two months later for four players.

Hoyt Wilhelm never played for the Royals. He was traded to the California Angels on December 12, 1968 for two players.

Lou Piniella never played for the Pilots. He was traded to the Royals on April 1, 1969.

Jesus Alou, Jack Billingham and Skip Guinn never played for the Expos. Alou and Donn Clendenon were traded to Houston for Rusty Staub. When Clendenon threatened to retire rather than report, Billingham and Guinn were sent to Houston to complete the trade.

Katawczik, Glass, Miklos, Richmond and Click never played in the Majors.

Ike Brookens never played for the Royals. He did not play in the Majors until making his debut with the Detroit Tigers in 1975.

Jimy Williams never played for the Expos or returned to the Majors.

Rick James never played for the Padres or returned to the Majors.

References

Major League Baseball expansion drafts
Expansion draft
Kansas City Royals
Seattle Pilots
Montreal Expos
San Diego Padres
Major League Baseball expansion draft